Lieutenant General Stafford LeRoy Irwin (March 23, 1893 – November 23, 1955) was a senior United States Army officer who served in World War II. He came from a family with a strong military tradition: he was the son of Major General George LeRoy Irwin -- for whom Fort Irwin, California, is named -- while his grandfather, Brigadier General Bernard J. D. Irwin, was a recipient of the Medal of Honor.

Early life and military career

Stafford LeRoy Irwin was born March 23, 1893, at Fort Monroe, Virginia, the son of Major General George LeRoy Irwin and his wife Marla Elizabeth. He attended the United States Military Academy (USMA) at West Point, New York in 1911, at the age of 18. He graduated 40th in a class of 164 in June 1915 as a part of the West Point class of 1915, also known as "the class the stars fell on". Many of Irwin's classmates became general officers during World War II, including Dwight D. Eisenhower, Omar Bradley, Henry Aurand, John W. Leonard, James Van Fleet, Joseph May Swing, Charles W. Ryder, Paul J. Mueller, Roscoe B. Woodruff, Vernon Prichard, Leland Hobbs, and numerous others.

He was subsequently commissioned as a second lieutenant in the Cavalry Branch of the United States Army on the same date of his graduation. Irwin subsequently served with the cavalry during the Pancho Villa Expedition, which was commanded by Brigadier General John J. Pershing, as a member of the 11th Cavalry Regiment in 1916 and the following year.

During World War I he served initially with the 80th Field Artillery Regiment, and then was a student at the U.S. Army Field Artillery School at Fort Sill, Oklahoma, where he was received promotion to the temporary rank of major but saw no service overseas as the war came to an end on November 11, 1918.

Between the wars
During the interwar period Irwin, realizing the cavalry was becoming obsolete (which trench warfare and World War I had shown), transferred to the Field Artillery Branch. From 1919 to 1920 he was Professor of Military Science and Tactics at Yale University and from 1920 to 1924 was an instructor for the Oklahoma Army National Guard. Between 1929 and 1933 he was an instructor for the U.S. Army Field Artillery School and, from 1933 to 1936 served with the Organized Reserves. He attended the U.S. Army Field Artillery School in 1926, the U.S. Army Command and General Staff School from 1926 to 1927, and the U.S. Army War College in 1937.

World War II
Stafford Irwin was the commander of artillery for the 9th Infantry Division in North Africa. He was noted for performing well during the Battle of Kasserine Pass in Tunisia, particularly during the engagement with Field Marshall Erwin Rommel at Thala. Following the North African campaign he was given command of the 5th Infantry Division during Patton's drive across Europe.

General Irwin finished the war as commander of XII Corps after Manton S. Eddy, the previous corps commander, was sent home due to ill health, and served in that position until September 1945.

Postwar and retirement
After the war, Irwin returned to the United States and became commander of V Corps in 1946 and director of the Military Intelligence Division in 1948. He was promoted to lieutenant general on October 15, 1950.  He finished his military career as the commander of U.S. Army forces in Austria from 1950 to 1952 when he retired due to medical problems on May 31, 1952.

Lt. Gen. Irwin died in 1955 of a coronary occlusion in Asheville, North Carolina, and was buried at Arlington National Cemetery.

Personal life
Irwin married in 1921 to Helen (Hall) Irwin and together they had one son, Francis LeRoy.  After Helen died in 1937, Irwin remarried in 1941 to Clare (Moran) Irwin. His second marriage also produced a son.

Decorations
Lieutenant General Irwin's ribbon bar:

References

External links

 Stafford LeRoy Irwin at ArlingtonCemetery.net, an unofficial website 
 Arlington National Cemetery
 Time Magazine December 1955 retrieved 5/12/09
 Field Artillery Magazine Jan/Feb 1949  retrieved 5/12/09
Generals of World War II
United States Army Officers 1939–1945

|-

|-

1893 births
1955 deaths
United States Army Cavalry Branch personnel
United States Army Field Artillery Branch personnel
United States Army personnel of World War I
Military personnel from Virginia
United States Military Academy alumni
Burials at Arlington National Cemetery
People from Hampton, Virginia
United States Army Command and General Staff College alumni
Recipients of the Silver Star
Recipients of the Distinguished Service Medal (US Army)
Recipients of the Legion of Merit
Graduates of the United States Military Academy Class of 1915
Recipients of the Czechoslovak War Cross
United States Army generals of World War II
United States Army generals
Yale University faculty